The Danish–Icelandic Trade Monopoly (Icelandic: Einokunarverslunin) was the monopoly on trade held by Danish merchants in Iceland in the 17th and 18th centuries. Iceland was during this period a territory controlled by the Danish-Norwegian Crown. The origins of the monopoly may be traced to the mercantilist policies of Denmark-Norway, and its aim was to support Danish merchants and Danish trade against the Hanseatic League of Hamburg, increasing the power of the King of Denmark in Iceland.

The monopoly was enacted by a set of laws passed in 1602 and lasted until 1786. Trade took place in 20 (later 25) designated trading posts, according to a fixed rate of prices determined by the king. The merchants divided the trading posts between themselves in exchange for a fixed rent. The Westman Islands were rented at a higher price. Danish merchants were forbidden to participate in economic activities in the country other than trade until 1777.

From 1602 until 1619, the trading monopoly was tied to the Danish cities of Copenhagen, Malmö (now in Sweden) and Helsingør. From 1620, trade was limited to Copenhagen exclusively.

Sources 
 Gísli Gunnarsson, Upp er boðið Ísaland: einokunarverslun og íslenskt samfélag 1602–1787, Reykjavík, Örn og Örlygur, 1987.

Denmark–Iceland relations
Trade blocs
Economic history of Denmark
History of international trade
17th century in Iceland
18th century in Iceland
1602 establishments in Denmark
Former monopolies
Foreign trade of Denmark